Embekka  is a village in Sri Lanka. It is located within Central Province.in the electorate of udunuwara

See also
List of towns in Central Province, Sri Lanka

External links

Populated places in Kandy District